The Women's artistic team all-around gymnastics competition at the 2018 Commonwealth Games in Gold Coast, Australia was held on 6 April 2018 at the Coomera Indoor Sports Centre.

This event also determined the qualification standings for the individual all-around and apparatus finals.

Schedule
The schedule is as follows:

All times are Australian Eastern Standard Time (UTC+10)

Results

Team competition
The results are as follows:

Qualification results

Individual all-around
The results are as follows:

Vault
The results are as follows:

Uneven bars
The results are as follows:

Balance beam
The results are as follows:

Floor
The results are as follows:

References

Gymnastics at the 2018 Commonwealth Games